Armadillidiidae is a family of woodlice, a terrestrial crustacean group in the order Isopoda. Unlike members of some other woodlice families, members of this family can roll into a ball, an ability they share with the outwardly similar but unrelated pill millipedes and other animals. This ability  gives woodlice in this family their common names of pill bugs or roly polies. Other common names include slaters,  potato bugs, and doodle bugs. Most species are native to the Mediterranean Basin, while a few species have wider European distributions. The best-known species, Armadillidium vulgare, was introduced to New England in the early 19th century and has become widespread throughout North America.

Ecology and behavior
Pill bugs in the family Armadillidiidae are able to form their bodies into a ball shape, in a process known as conglobation. This behaviour is shared with pill millipedes (which are often confused with pill bugs), armadillos, and cuckoo wasps. It may be triggered by stimuli such as vibrations or pressure, and is a key defense against predation; it may also reduce respiratory water losses.

The diet of pill bugs is largely made up of decaying or decomposed plant matter such as leaves, and to a lesser extent, wood fibers. Pill bugs will also eat living plants, especially in wet conditions, sometimes consuming leaves, stems, shoots, roots, tubers, and fruits.  Pill bugs can be serious pests in certain agricultural systems, particularly in areas that are prone to heavy rains and flood conditions.  Pill bugs will feed on numerous crop plants including corn, beans, squash, peas, melon, chard, beet, cucumber, potato, spinach, lettuce, and strawberry, with potential for significant yield loss in strawberry in particular. Some species of pill bugs are known to eat decaying animal flesh or feces. They will also eat shed snakeskin and dead bugs, if necessary.

Pill bugs contribute to their ecosystem as decomposers.

Classification
The family Armadillidiidae is differentiated from other woodlouse families by the two-segmented nature of the antennal flagellum, by the form of the uropods, and by the ability to roll into a ball.

Within the family Armadillidiidae, 15 genera are currently recognized:

Alloschizidium Verhoeff, 1919 (13 species)
Armadillidium Brandt, 1831 (189 species)
Ballodillium Vandel, 1961 (monotypic)
Cristarmadillidium Arcangeli, 1936 (4 species)
Cyphodillidium Verhoeff, 1939 (monotypic)
Echinarmadillidium  Verhoeff, 1901 (3 species)
Eleoniscus Racovitza, 1907 (monotypic)
Eluma Budde-Lund, 1885 (3 species)
Paraschizidium Verhoeff, 1919 (5 species)
Paxodillidium Schmalfuss, 1985 (monotypic)
Platanosphaera Strouhal, 1956 (6 species)
Schizidium Verhoeff, 1901 (26 species)
Trichodillidium Schmalfuss, 1989 (3 species)
Troglarmadillidium Verhoeff, 1900 (8 species)
Trogleluma Vandel, 1946 (2 species)
Typhlarmadillidium Verhoeff, 1900 (4 species)

A 2022 study of myrmecophilous populations indicated that these represented a new species of Cristarmadillidium, and three new species within a new genus, Iberiarmadillidium.

References

External links
 
 
 Regional maps for the most common American names for this isopod can be found in the results for question 74 of the Harvard Dialect Survey 

Woodlice
Crustacean families